Symbols and Pictographs Extended-A is a Unicode block containing emoji characters.  It extends the set of symbols included in the Supplemental Symbols and Pictographs block.

All of the characters in the Symbols and Pictographs Extended-A block are emoji.

Emoji modifiers

The Symbols and Pictographs Extended-A block has twelve emoji that represent people or body parts.
They can be modified using U+1F3FB–U+1F3FF to provide for a range of skin tones using the Fitzpatrick scale:

Additional human emoji can be found in other Unicode blocks: Dingbats, Emoticons, Miscellaneous Symbols, Miscellaneous Symbols and Pictographs, Supplemental Symbols and Pictographs and Transport and Map Symbols.

History
The following Unicode-related documents record the purpose and process of defining specific characters in the Symbols and Pictographs Extended-A block:

References 

Unicode blocks
Emoji